Dunedin Academy is a K–12 private school in Dunedin, Florida, US. The school had an enrollment of 181 in year 2007–08. It is a Christian, non-denominational, co-educational school.

Dunedin Academy state that their Elementary & Middle School has won over 100 national and state awards. Student Alissa Jeup won the statewide 1994 Junior American Citizens contest that was sponsored by the Daughters of the American Revolution. Gregory Culmone then won the 1996 contest.

Notable alumni
 Stephen Bessette, New York Yankees
 Christopher J Mauer, basis for the HBO television series, "Hung"
 Nathan Rich, scientology critic

References

External links
 Official site

High schools in Pinellas County, Florida
Private high schools in Florida
Private middle schools in Florida
Private elementary schools in Florida
Buildings and structures in Dunedin, Florida